Chu Fujia (born 10 September 1989 in Jiangsu, China) is a Chinese baseball infielder for the Jiangsu Hopestars.

He was a member of the China national baseball team competing in the 2009 World Baseball Classic, 2012 Asia Series, 2012 Asian Baseball Championship, 2013 World Baseball Classic, 2013 East Asian Games, 2014 Asian Games, 2015 Asian Baseball Championship,  2017 World Baseball Classic and 2018 Asian Games.

References

1989 births
Living people
Asian Games competitors for China
Baseball infielders
Baseball players at the 2010 Asian Games
Baseball players at the 2018 Asian Games
Baseball players from Jiangsu
Chinese expatriate baseball players in the United States
Jiangsu Hopestars players
Sportspeople from Wuxi
Texas AirHogs players
2009 World Baseball Classic players
2013 World Baseball Classic players
2017 World Baseball Classic players